Section 21 of the Constitution Act, 1867 is a provision of the Constitution of Canada relating to the composition of the Senate of Canada. The section sets out the total number of senators, currently set at 105. Section 21 originally provided that the Senate would be composed of 72 senators, but that number has gradually increased as new provinces and territories joined Confederation.

The Constitution Act, 1867 is the constitutional statute which established Canada.  Originally named the British North America Act, 1867, the Act continues to be the foundational statute for the Constitution of Canada, although it has been amended many times since 1867.  It is now recognised as part of the supreme law of Canada.

Constitution Act, 1867

The Constitution Act, 1867 is part of the Constitution of Canada and thus part of the supreme law of Canada.  It was the product of extensive negotiations by the governments of the British North American provinces in the 1860s. The Act sets out the constitutional framework of Canada, including the structure of the federal government and the powers of the federal government and the provinces.  Originally enacted in 1867 by the British Parliament under the name the British North America Act, 1867, in 1982 the Act was brought under full Canadian control through the Patriation of the Constitution, and was renamed the Constitution Act, 1867.  Since Patriation the Act can only be amended in Canada, under the amending formula set out in the Constitution Act, 1982.

Text of section 21 

Section 21 reads:

Section 21 is found in Part IV of the Constitution Act, 1867, dealing with legislative powers of the federal Parliament.

Amendments

When originally enacted in 1867, section 21 provided that there would be 72 senators.

Section 21 has been amended by implication several times since 1867.  Each time a new province was added, the Senate was expanded, and eventually the federal territories also acquired Senate representation. The wording of section 21 was not formally amended by those additions, but has been consolidated to the present wording by the federal Department of Justice in the online version of the Constitution Act, 1867.

Purpose and interpretation

Section 21 sets out the basic number of senators.  Subsequent sections of the Act allocate those Senate seats to the provinces and territories.  There is also a provision for the appointment of additional senators, in exceptional cases.  Appointment of additional senators temporarily increases the size of the Senate, but no further appointments to a senate division can occur until the number of senators representing that divisions has reverted to the basic number in section 21, as senators retire.

Related provisions

Section 22 of the Act allocates  the Senate seats to the provinces and territories, primarily to the four Senate divisions of the Maritimes, Quebec, Ontario, and the West.

Section 26 of the Act provides for the appointment of additional senators, in exceptional cases.

Section 27 of the Act provides that if additional senators have been appointed, no further appointments to a Senate division can be made until the number of senators from that division is back to the normal number.

Section 28 of the Act provides that at no time will the number of senators exceed 113.

References 

Constitution of Canada
Canadian Confederation
Federalism in Canada